The R337 road is a short regional road in Ireland, located in Galway city.

References

Regional roads in the Republic of Ireland
Roads in County Galway